Ahmed Abd El-Zaher ( born 15 January 1985) is an Egyptian footballer who currently plays for the Egyptian Premier League side Aswan SC. He was also part of the Egypt U-20 National Football team that participated in the 2005 FIFA World Youth Championship.

Club career
Abd El-Zaher had a modest showing during the beginning of the 2009–10 Egyptian Premier League. That completely changed when head coach Stoycho Mladenov took control at ENPPI. Abd El-Zaher saw more regular first team football and repaid his manager faith by scoring 5 league goals by the end of that season. Mladenov then left to Bulgarian CSKA Sofia and Mokhtar Mokhtar then took over the team in the 2011-12 season. Abd El-Zaher finished that season as top scorer of the league tied with Zamalek's Shikabala. They both had 13 goals. Early in 2012, Mladenov made a request to ENPPI to move Abd El-Zaher to his club CSKA Sofia in the 2012 summer transfer window. The move was possible but ENPPI were somewhat reluctant to lose one of their top strikers. In January 2013, he moved to league rivals Al-Ahly on a four-year deal. In November 2013, Abd El-Zaher was deprived of his Champions League win bonus, suspended and put up for sale in the January transfer window for doing a Rabia sign in support of recently deposed President Mohamed Morsi after scoring a goal. On 5 December 2013, the Egyptian Football Association took sanctions a step further, announcing that Abd El-Zaher has been banned from representing Egypt for one year in addition to a 3-month local ban. He moved to Al-Ittihad Club (Tripoli) on loan from Al-Ahly in December 2013 as punishment for the Rabia sign.

International career
Ahmed Abd El-Zaher was part of the Egypt U-20 National Football team that participated in the 2005 FIFA World Youth Championship. He participated in all of Egypt's three group matches, but did not score any goals.

International goals
Correct as of 27 November 2012

References

External links
 
 
 

1985 births
Living people
Egyptian footballers
Egyptian expatriate footballers
Egypt international footballers
Association football forwards
ENPPI SC players
Al Ahly SC players
Al-Ittihad Club (Tripoli) players
Misr Lel Makkasa SC players
Haras El Hodoud SC players
Aswan SC players
Egyptian Premier League players
Egyptian expatriate sportspeople in Libya
Expatriate footballers in Libya
Libyan Premier League players
People from Gharbia Governorate